Mamasa may refer to:

Mamasa language, an Austronesian language of Sulawesi, Indonesia
Mamasa Regency, one of the five regencies that make up the West Sulawesi Province, Indonesia
Mamasa River, a river in Sulawesi, Indonesia

See also
Polewali-Mamasa, a former Indonesian Regency that used to be part of South Sulawesi but is now part of West Sulawesi province
Toraja Mamasa Church, a Protestant church established in 1947, and based in West Sulawesi. It is